Huntleya citrina is a species of orchid that occurs in western Colombia and Ecuador.

References

citrina